Huwyler is a surname originating from Upper Swabia in the Middle Ages, connecting the region between the current Bavaria and Swiss-German cantons. This surname is still recognized as linked to the Swiss central region (Zurich, Zug and Lucerne) with roots in the cities of Risch and Steinhausen.

Huwyler is a topographic surname from the Huwyl castle and hamlet located between Römerswil and Hochdorf, Lucerne around the 15th century. The Huwyl area was named as Hunwil in documents dating from 1230 to 1474.  The surname started from the Lords von Hunwil (Herren von Hunwil, Giswil OW). The von Hunwil surname is well documented as they were ministerialis barons. In the 15th and 16th centuries, Swiss surnames were derived by appending the syllable –er. This largely replaced the practice of using the "von" prefix. Surname von Hunwil evolved over the years to Huwiler and Huwyler (and even Hauviller in France).

People 
 Beat Huwyler (born 1961), Swiss theologist
 Burkard Huwiler (1868–1954), Swiss Roman Catholic bishop
 Daniel Huwyler (born 1963), Swiss cyclist
 Friedrich Huwyler (1942–2009), Swiss politician
 Heidrun Huwyler (born 1942), impressionist painter
 Jakob Huwyler (1867–1938), Swiss artist
 Jost Franz Huwyler-Boller (1874–1930), Swiss architect
 Max Huwyler (1931–2023), Swiss writer
 Mike Huwiler (born 1972), American soccer player

Other uses 

 Huwiler Tower, Zug, Switzerland 
 Huwyl, a hamlet near Hochdorf, Lucerne, Switzerland 
 Huwyl Burg, a castle near Römerswil, Switzerland

References

Surnames of Swiss origin
Swiss-German surnames
Swiss-language surnames
German-language surnames
Alemannic German language
Surnames of German origin
House
Noble families
Swiss families
German coats of arms